Ilbank A.Ş., short for İller Bankası Anonim Şirketi, is a state-owned  development and investment bank based in Ankara, Turkey. It is subordinated to the Ministry of Environment and Urban Planning. Main areas of expertise of Ilbank are banking and insurance, mapping, drinking water supplies and treatment, sewage collection and disposal, wastewater treatment, solid waste management, urban superstructures.

History
İlbank was founded on 11 June 1933 under the name "Belediyeler Bankası"(in Eng:"Bank of Municipalities") according to law numbered 2301. Afterwards, the name of the bank was changed to "İller Bankası" on July 27, 1944 amid debates during Budget Committee due to fact that Special Provincial Administrations and villages were out of the scope of loans and assistances, along with increasing urbanization in conjunction with rapid  population growth that created  more demand on funds. İller Bankası, including Special Provincial Administrations and villages was formally established on June 13, 1945 with law number 4759. İlbank's organizational status was then transformed to an incorporated company with the Law #6107 enacted on January 26, 2011.

Organization
The shareholders of the company are municipalities and provincial special agencies (İÖİ). The bank's board of directors consists of two bank deputy directors, four members appointed by the Ministry of Environment and Urban Planning, two by the Ministry of the Interior representing the municipalities and İÖİ, and two mayors or members of İÖİ, who were attendants of the bank's general assembly. In February 2014,the Banking Regulation and Supervision Agency (BDDK) approved the appointment of Mehmet Turgut Dedeoğlu as the director general of the bank.

Sports
İlbank has a multi-branch sports club with the same title consisting of Taekwondo, volleyball. Its women's volleyball team İller Bankası Women's Volleyball play in the Turkish Women's Volleyball League.

References

External links 
 Official Website

Banks of Turkey
Investment banks
Banks established in 1933
Banks established in 2011
Companies based in Ankara
Çankaya, Ankara
Turkish companies established in 2011
Turkish companies established in 1933